Uncisudis is a genus of barracudinas.

Species
There are currently four recognized species in this genus:
 Uncisudis advena (Rofen, 1963)
 Uncisudis longirostra Maul, 1956
 Uncisudis posteropelvis Fukui & Ozawa, 2004
 Uncisudis quadrimaculata (Post, 1969)

References

Paralepididae